David Aboro Fitzpatrick (born 10 February 1995) is an English footballer who plays as a midfielder for Metropolitan Police.

Playing career
Fitzpatrick was brought up in Surbiton and attended Richard Challoner School in Malden Manor. He had been in the youth system at Fulham until 2009, before spells with Staines Town and Hampton & Richmond Borough. Having come through the ranks at QPR, Fitzpatrick was signed by AFC Wimbledon on 23 September 2014 by Alan Reeves as part of the club's newly formed under-21 side, after impressing as a trialist. He first appeared as an unused substitute in the 2–0 away loss to Wycombe Wanderers on 18 October 2014. He made his football league debut on 28 December 2014, coming on as a 76th-minute substitute against Exeter City which ended in a 4–1 victory for the "Dons". He scored his first goal for Wimbledon in January 2016. Fitzpatrick signed for Barrow on 28 June 2017 on a 1-year deal. 

After leaving Barrow, he had spells at Dorking Wanderers, Kingstonian and Walton Casuals before signing for Southern League side Farnborough in February 2020.

After beginning the 2020–21 campaign with Farnborough, Fitzpatrick made the move to Metropolitan Police in October.

Career statistics

References

External links

Non-league stats at Aylesbury United
Kingstonian stats

1995 births
Living people
People from Surbiton
Footballers from the Royal Borough of Kingston upon Thames
English footballers
Association football midfielders
Fulham F.C. players
Staines Town F.C. players
Hampton & Richmond Borough F.C. players
Queens Park Rangers F.C. players
AFC Wimbledon players
Tonbridge Angels F.C. players
Torquay United F.C. players
Barrow A.F.C. players
English Football League players
National League (English football) players